Pliomelaena luzonica is a species of tephritid or fruit flies in the genus Pliomelaena of the family Tephritidae.

Distribution
Philippines.

References

Tephritinae
Insects described in 1974
Diptera of Asia